William or Bill Dutton may refer to:

William H. Dutton (born 1947), British academician and professor
William Dutton (captain) (1811–1878), Australian whaler
William Dutton (singer), a member of the boy band The Choirboys and later on solo singer
William Dutton (speed skater) (born 1989), Canadian speed skater
Bill Dutton (American football), American football player
Bill Dutton (trainer), British jockey and racehorse trainer